There are seven National Natural Landmarks in the U.S. state of Alabama.

See also
List of National Historic Landmarks in Alabama

External links
National Natural Landmarks in Alabama

Alabama
National Natural Landmarks